JMU may refer to:

 James Madison University, in Harrisonburg, Virginia, United States
 Jamui railway station, in Bihar, India
 Japan Marine United
 Jiamusi Dongjiao Airport, in Heilongjiang, China
 Jimei University, in Xiamen, Fujian, China
 Jewish Military Union, a Second World War resistance organization
 Julius-Maximilians University of Würzburg, in Germany
 Liverpool John Moores University, in England